Mike Maxfield (born 23 February 1944, Manchester, England) is an English songwriter and guitarist, who came to fame as a member of The Dakotas. He composed their song "The Cruel Sea", which was also recorded by The Ventures (see The Ventures discography).

Collaboration
Other acts with which Maxfield has collaborated include:
 George Martin
 Coffin Daggers
 Les Champions
 The Challengers

Notes

External links
 

English songwriters
English pop guitarists
English male guitarists
Musicians from Manchester
1944 births
Living people
The Dakotas (band) members
British male songwriters